The Asia/Oceania Zone was one of three zones of regional competition in the 2013 Fed Cup.

Group I
Venue: National Tennis Centre, Astana, Kazakhstan (indoor hard)
Dates: 6–9 February

The seven teams were divided into one pool of three and one pool of four teams. The two pool winners took part in play-offs to determine the nation advanced to the World Group II play-offs. The nations finishing last in their pools took part in relegation play-offs, with the losing nation was relegated to Group II for 2014.

Pools

Play-offs

 advanced to World Group II play-offs.
 was relegated to Asia/Oceania Group II in 2014.

Group II
Venue: National Tennis Centre, Astana, Kazakhstan (indoor hard)
Dates: 4–10 February
The eleven teams were divided into one pool of five and one pool of six teams. The winners of each pool played off against each other to determine which one team advanced to Asia/Oceania Zone Group I in 2014. All the other nations competed in the same manner for the positional play-offs.

Pools

Play-offs 

 was promoted to Asia/Oceania Group I in 2014.

See also
Fed Cup structure

References

 Fed Cup Result, 2013 Asia/Oceania Group I
 Fed Cup Result, 2013 Asia/Oceania Group II

External links
 Fed Cup website

 
Asia Oceania
Sport in Astana
Tennis tournaments in Kazakhstan